John Jay Moores (born July 9, 1944, in San Antonio, Texas, as John Jay Broderick) is an American entrepreneur and philanthropist, and the former owner of the San Diego Padres of Major League Baseball (MLB).

Early life
Moores was born in San Antonio, Texas—the eldest son of Jack and Katherine Broderick.  Jack Broderick abandoned his wife, son John, and two younger sons in 1948.  In 1950, Katherine wed again, to Cyrus "Red" Moores, a photographer with the Corpus Christi Caller newspaper, and her sons were given their stepfather's name. Red Moores, by then in insurance, moved the family to  Houston, Texas in 1960, and John spent his high school years there. He left Texas A&M University before graduating and became a programmer for IBM. He later studied at the University of Houston where he earned his Bachelor of Science degree in economics and a Juris Doctor from the University of Houston Law Center.

Career

Business
He founded BMC Software in Texas in 1980 and was the lead venture capital financier for Peregrine Systems in California starting in 1981 as well as ServiceNow, another California corporation founded in 2005. He served as a director of Peregrine from March 1989 to March 2003 and as chairman of the board from March 1990 through July 2000 and from May 2002 through March 2003, during which he cashed out between US$600 and US$630 million in Peregrine stock. He resigned as Peregrine chairman in February 2003 as part of the company's Chapter 11 reorganization.  He also founded JMI Equity. In 1994 Moores purchased the San Diego Padres professional baseball team from Tom Werner.  In 2009, he began the process of incrementally selling the Padres to a group of 12 investors, headed by Jeff Moorad (former sports agent and CEO of the Arizona Diamondbacks) for about $500 million. The deal fell through in 2012, and Moores instead sold the team for $800 million to a group led by Ron Fowler.

He continues to operate in the IT service management market with continued investments through his venture capital firm JMI Equity.

Philanthropy and activism
Organizations that Moores has supported include the ACLU, the San Diego Zoo, San Diego State University, the San Diego Symphony, San Diego Center for Children, the Boys and Girls Clubs, St. Vincent de Paul Villages, the National Multiple Sclerosis Society, and The Scripps Research Institute where Moores sits on the board.

His 1991 contribution of US$51 million to the University of Houston was the largest in U.S. history to a public university. He served on the University of Houston System Board of Regents from 1991 to 1994. Among many other philanthropic efforts, John and Becky Moores donated US$21 million to establish the John and Rebecca Moores Cancer Center at University of California, San Diego and over US$20 million to San Diego State University. In 1999 he was appointed Regent of the University of California by Governor Gray Davis until he resigned for unknown reasons in 2007.  As UC regent, he worked to make sure Proposition 209 (passed in 1996) was implemented. In 2005, he was elected chair of the Carter Center at Emory University, succeeding Jimmy Carter. Most recently, Moores is a member of the board of trustees for the Blum Center for Developing Economies at the University of California, Berkeley. The center is focused on finding solutions to address the crisis of extreme poverty and disease in the developing world.

Moores is also the founder of the River Blindness Foundation, a non-profit organisation dedicated to research and treatment of Onchocerciasis, the second most common cause of infectious blindness.

In 2016 Moores began negotiations to buy English soccer club Nottingham Forest, with a view to buying between 80% and 100% of the shares from Kuwaiti owner Fawaz Al-Hasawi for a reported $61.87 million. However, the deal unexpectedly collapsed at the 11th hour with both sides with no clear reason given by either party.

Personal life 
In February 2008, Moores' wife Becky filed for divorce, citing irreconcilable differences. Moores gave up ownership of the family home on a golf course at Pebble Beach, California. The property overlooked the Pacific and the 18th fairway of the golf course.  The divorce also prompted a major overhaul of the San Diego Padres roster, followed by the sale of Moores's majority ownership of the MLB team.  During the divorce proceedings, Moores spent the majority of his time in Texas and refused to attend Padres and San Diego State games, while his wife regularly attended Padres games. In 2013, Moores married Dianne Rosenberg.

Honors and awards
 1996: Donor of the Year by the National Association of Athletic Development Directors
 1997: San Diego Jackie Robinson YMCA Human Dignity Award

See also
 Moores School of Music

References

External links
University of Houston - biography
"Batting Cleanup", San Diego Metropolitan (Sept. 1996) by Ron Donoho Cover story about John Moores
Alan Zarembo, "Putting Them to the Test", Los Angeles Times, January 27, 2004. Retrieved July 23, 2006.
BMC Software - Corporate

1944 births
Living people
American computer businesspeople
American philanthropists
Major League Baseball owners
Businesspeople in software
Businesspeople from San Antonio
Businesspeople from San Diego
People from Corpus Christi, Texas
San Diego Padres owners
Scripps Research
University of California regents
University of Houston alumni
University of Houston Law Center alumni
University of Houston System regents